Talar Posht-e Sofla (also Romanized as Tālār Posht-e Soflá;; also known as Pā’īn Tālār Posht) is a village in Aliabad Rural District, in the Central District of Qaem Shahr County, Mazandaran Province, Iran. At the 2006 census, its population was 1,394, in 351 families.

References 

Populated places in Qaem Shahr County